Whalan  is a suburb of Sydney, in the state of New South Wales, Australia. Whalan is located 45 kilometres west of the Sydney central business district, in the local government area of the City of Blacktown and is part of the Greater Western Sydney region.

History
Whalan takes its name from James Whalan, who was granted  at Mount Druitt by Governor Ralph Darling in 1831. His father was Sergeant Charles Whalan who was Governor Lachlan Macquarie's orderly sergeant and in charge of the Light Horse Guard. James Whalan explored the areas around Jenolan Caves and the Blue Mountains and discovered the rock formation known as Grand Arch pursuing the bushranger McKeown.

Population
According to the 2016 census, there were 5,973 people in Whalan.
 Aboriginal and Torres Strait Islander people made up 8.7% of the population. 
 63.4% of people were born in Australia. The nextmost common countries of birth were New Zealand 4.0%, Philippines 3.0%, Samoa 2.3%, Fiji 2.2% and England 1.7%.  
 65.5% of people spoke only English at home. Other languages spoken at home included Samoan 4.3%, Arabic 2.7%, Hindi 2.3% and Tagalog 1.8%. 
 The most common responses for religion were Catholic 24.9%, No Religion 21.1% and Anglican 15.0%.

Parks and recreation
Whalan has an extensive reserve that is made up of four soccer fields and four football fields. It also has numerous parks and a large go-cart track that is available to use every Saturday. As well there are numerous smaller parks and reserves dotted around the leafy suburb including RAAF Park on the eastern boundary. This park is a memorial to the RAAF camp that was on the site during WW2. There was also an airfield nearby with the runway still in existence as the main road access to Whalan Reserve. The old Mt Druitt motor racing track used to run along this runway and parts of Luxford Road and Kuringai Ave prior to the NSW Housing Commission developing the area in the mid-1960s.

Schools
Whalan has three public schools, Whalan Public, Madang Public and the special needs school, Halinda. Whalan High School was closed shortly after the debacle involving the Daily Telegraph newspaper and Mt Druitt High School HSC students who were wrongfully labelled as 'failures' (for which the newspaper apologized and settled out of court a class action brought by students and teachers). Several high schools in the area were closed and reorganized as Chifley College with campuses at Dharruk, Shalvey, North St Marys and Bidwill. Halinda and the PCYC offices are now using the grounds and buildings.

References 

Suburbs of Sydney
City of Blacktown